Muhammed Ali Doğan (born 10 August 1995) is a footballer who plays as a midfielder for Vanspor. He made his Süper Lig debut on 2 March 2014. Born in Germany, he represented Turkey at under-19 international level.

References

External links
 
 
 Muhammed Ali Doğan at eurosport.com
 Muhammed Ali Doğan at goal.com
 
 

1995 births
Sportspeople from Oberhausen
Footballers from North Rhine-Westphalia
German people of Turkish descent
Living people
Turkish footballers
Turkey youth international footballers
German footballers
Association football midfielders
Elazığspor footballers
Balıkesirspor footballers
Menemenspor footballers
Vanspor footballers
Süper Lig players
TFF First League players
TFF Second League players